Herekino is a locality in Northland, New Zealand. It lies 26 km south west of Kaitaia. The Herekino Harbour, also called the Herekino River, is an estuary and inlet from the Tasman Sea to the west. The Herekino Forest, which contains a stand of large kauri, is to the north, and the Tauroa Peninsula lies to the north west.

The harbour is mostly above water at high tide, with just a shallow entrance channel. The upper reaches of the harbour contain a mangrove forest.
The township of Herekino is at the north east end of the estuary, and the small settlement of Owhata lies on the rocky south shore of the harbour entrance. Owhata is a flat grassy area, with a fairly shallow beach of mud and sand. There is not much natural shelter, and there is a limited supply of fresh water in summer.

Demographics
The SA1 area is part of the larger Herekino-Takahue statistical area.

The SA1 statistical area had a population of 84 at the 2018 New Zealand census, a decrease of 12 people (−12.5%) since the 2013 census, and a decrease of 27 people (−24.3%) since the 2006 census. There were 30 households, comprising 42 males and 42 females, giving a sex ratio of 1.0 males per female. The median age was 44.5 years (compared with 37.4 years nationally), with 18 people (21.4%) aged under 15 years, 9 (10.7%) aged 15 to 29, 39 (46.4%) aged 30 to 64, and 18 (21.4%) aged 65 or older.

Ethnicities were 46.4% European/Pākehā, 67.9% Māori, 14.3% Pacific peoples, and 3.6% other ethnicities. People may identify with more than one ethnicity.

Of those people who chose to answer the census's question about religious affiliation, 28.6% had no religion, 60.7% were Christian and 7.1% had Māori religious beliefs.

Of those at least 15 years old, 6 (9.1%) people had a bachelor or higher degree, and 18 (27.3%) people had no formal qualifications. The median income was $20,300, compared with $31,800 nationally. 3 people (4.5%) earned over $70,000 compared to 17.2% nationally. The employment status of those at least 15 was that 21 (31.8%) people were employed full-time, 21 (31.8%) were part-time, and 3 (4.5%) were unemployed.

Herekino-Takahue statistical area

Herekino-Takahue had a population of 963 at the 2018 New Zealand census, an increase of 36 people (3.9%) since the 2013 census, and a decrease of 3 people (−0.3%) since the 2006 census. There were 330 households, comprising 519 males and 444 females, giving a sex ratio of 1.17 males per female. The median age was 43.2 years (compared with 37.4 years nationally), with 222 people (23.1%) aged under 15 years, 141 (14.6%) aged 15 to 29, 432 (44.9%) aged 30 to 64, and 165 (17.1%) aged 65 or older.

Ethnicities were 64.2% European/Pākehā, 52.3% Māori, 4.0% Pacific peoples, 0.9% Asian, and 1.6% other ethnicities. People may identify with more than one ethnicity.

The percentage of people born overseas was 10.6, compared with 27.1% nationally.

Of those people who chose to answer the census's question about religious affiliation, 39.6% had no religion, 41.7% were Christian, 3.4% had Māori religious beliefs, 0.3% were Hindu, 1.2% were Buddhist and 2.5% had other religions.

Of those at least 15 years old, 90 (12.1%) people had a bachelor or higher degree, and 183 (24.7%) people had no formal qualifications. The median income was $20,600, compared with $31,800 nationally. 57 people (7.7%) earned over $70,000 compared to 17.2% nationally. The employment status of those at least 15 was that 273 (36.8%) people were employed full-time, 138 (18.6%) were part-time, and 45 (6.1%) were unemployed.

History and culture

Pre-European history

Herekino was named by the Māori chief Tohe, who passed through on the way to visit the local chief Taunaha at Owhata and noticed a lasso-type of bird trap which had been incorrectly tied, which would cause the prey unnecessary suffering. He named the area Herekino-a-Taunaha (the false knot of Taunaha).

Ngāti Ruānui (now Te Aupōuri) dominated the Herekino and Whangape harbours and several battles were fought against other iwi in the area before European settlement.

European settlement

In 1846, the brig H.M.S. Osprey mistook the Herekino Heads with the entrance to the Hokianga, about 30 km to the south, due to misty weather and the similarity of the two features - both have a northern head formed by sand dunes. The Osprey was driven ashore on the shallow sand bank just north of the headland. There were no deaths. Wreckage is still visible.  Herekino was named on some charts as "False Hokianga" due to the similarity of the entrances.

Dalmatian immigrants were growing grapes in Herekino by the late 1890s and by 1906, there were 14 vineyards.

In the mid 1960s Herekino was a small township with shops - a butcher, a petrol station and more. However following the sealing of State Highway 1 through the Mangamuka Gorge to Kaitaia, the township quickly declined.

Marae

Herekino has two marae, affiliated with Ngāti Kurī and Te Aupōuri of Te Rarawa: Rangikohu Marae and Ruia te Aroha meeting house; and Manukau Marae and Whakamaharatanga meeting house.

In October 2020, the Government committed $1,407,731 from the Provincial Growth Fund to upgrade the two marae and 7 other Te Rarawa marae, creating 100 jobs.

Education
Herekino School is a coeducational full primary (years 1-8) school with a roll of  students as of  The school was established in 1888. A fire destroyed the first building in 1909, and its replacement also burned down in 1944.

Notes

Far North District
Ports and harbours of New Zealand
Populated places in the Northland Region